The Zogist salute, or the nationalist Albanian salute, is a military salute of Albania since used by civilians in other countries. The salute is a gesture whereby the right hand is placed over the heart, with the palm facing downwards.

The salute is still popular with modern supporters of Zogu and Albanian monarchists in general, and the Albanian nationalists of the Balli Kombëtar. Under the post-war communist government of Enver Hoxha, the Zogist salute was used by dissidents as an anti-regime statement.

History
The distinctive gesture was instituted as a salute by King Zog I of the Albanians. It was first widely used by King Zog's personal police force and was later adopted by the Royal Albanian Army.

, when confronted by the Nazi greeting "Heil Hitler", would respond with a "Heil Zogu" salute, leading the German diplomats, to believe it was a standard Albanian greeting.

Other countries

A similar salute is also used in India by the organization Rashtriya Swayamsevak Sangh. This salute is called Sangh pranaam. It is also used in India in schools as one of the salutes for the national pledge.
In Latin America, especially in Mexico, a gesture similar to the Zogist salute is used by civilians to salute the Mexican flag during the national anthem.

See also

 Albanian Kingdom (1928–1939)
 Bellamy salute
 Bras d'honneur
 Olympic salute
 Quenelle (gesture) 
 Raised fist
 Roman salute

References

External links

Royal Albanian Army
Military of Albania
Hand gestures
Albanian culture
Gestures of respect
Salutes